The Temple Gardens Hotel & Spa (formerly Temple Gardens Mineral Spa) is a hotel located in downtown Moose Jaw, Saskatchewan, Canada.  The resort features 181 rooms, a spa, banquet facilities, a rooftop indoor/outdoor mineral pool, and is connected to Casino Moose Jaw.

History 

In 1910 drillers, who were looking for oil, discovered the hot springs that now service the hotel.

The hotel was originally built with 69 rooms at cost of $9 million; funds were a mixture of private and government investment. It is named after the historic Temple Gardens Dance Hall, one block north. The hotel was later expanded to 179 rooms.

On May 30, 1997, Peter Gzowski broadcast the final episode of his CBC Radio morning show Morningside from Temple Gardens; the facility's café was renamed the "Morningsides Café" in his honour 

In 1997, Peter Gzowski's final broadcast of CBC Radio program  Morningside was broadcast from the resort instead of CBC studios. The broadcast gave the hotel national exposure. The resort café is named the Morningside Cafe in recognition.

In 2006, the hotel was purchased by Temple REIT for $21 million. In 2022, Temple Hotels sold the hotel to Peepeekisis Cree Nation, with Saskatoon-based Globex Management assuming operations. The new owners stated that there were plans for potential renovations in the future, but stated that they did not plan to change the property's name or theming.

References

External links

Temple Hotels Inc.
Atlific Hotels

Hotel buildings completed in 1996
Hotels in Saskatchewan
Buildings and structures in Moose Jaw
Buildings and structures completed in 1996
Hotels established in 1996
Hot springs of Saskatchewan
1996 establishments in Saskatchewan